Acoustic spectroscopy may refer to:
 Spectrogrammetry; plotting the energy versus frequency over time
 Ultrasound attenuation spectroscopy, instead of energy, the attenuation coefficient is measured versus frequency
 Acoustic resonance spectroscopy, using forced vibrations to excite multiple normal modes to obtain a resonance spectrum